Novaya Barsha (Kaitag: Йенги Баршша; Dargwa: Сагаси Барша) is a rural locality (a selo) in Yangikentsky Selsoviet, Kaytagsky District, Republic of Dagestan, Russia. The population was 153 as of 2010. There are 2 streets.

Geography 
Novaya Barsha is located 9 km north of Madzhalis (the district's administrative centre) by road. Yangikent and Chumli are the nearest rural localities.

Nationalities 
Dargins live there.

References 

Rural localities in Kaytagsky District